Zalina Chermenovna Sidakova (born 23 March 1992)  is a Russian-Belarusian freestyle wrestler. She won two silver medals at the World Wrestling Championships: both in the women's 59 kg event in 2012 and in the women's 55 kg event in 2018.

In 2020, she won one of the bronze medals in the women's 53 kg event at the Individual Wrestling World Cup held in Belgrade, Serbia.

Major results

References

External links 
 

Living people
1992 births
Sportspeople from Vladikavkaz
Belarusian female sport wrestlers
World Wrestling Championships medalists
21st-century Belarusian women